Daniel Morrison McLennan (5 May 1925 – 11 May 2004) was a Scottish football player and coach. As a player, he was a Scottish League Cup winner with East Fife. His extensive coaching career took him all around the world and spanned a period of forty years, during which he managed ten national teams: the Philippines, Mauritius, Rhodesia, Iran, Bahrain, Iraq, Malawi, Jordan, Fiji and Libya.

Playing career
Born in Stirling, McLennan represented Scotland at schoolboy international level and played junior football for Lochore Welfare. He joined Rangers as a 17–year-old apprentice, but after failing to break through to the first team he moved to Falkirk. McLennan's most successful spell as a player was at East Fife from 1947 to 1957. He was part of the team that won the Scottish League Cup in 1953. He played briefly for Dundee before joining Berwick Rangers as player–manager.

Management career
His first coaching role came as player-manager of Berwick Rangers in 1957, and went on to coach the national teams of the Philippines, Mauritius, Rhodesia, Iran, Bahrain, Iraq, Malawi, Jordan, Fiji, and Libya.

McLennan lead Stirling Albion to promotion to the top division in 1961, and to the semi finals of Scottish League Cup for the first time, also in 1961.

With both Rhodesia, in 1970, and Iran, in 1974, McLennan almost qualified for the FIFA World Cup, but lost out in the play-off round twice.

He took Malawi to its first African Cup of Nations in 1984. Unfortunately a rigged draw between Algeria and Nigeria ended any hopes of qualifying from the group. He also managed Indian club Churchill Brothers.

Honours

Player
East Fife
Scottish League Cup: 1953–54

Manager
Stirling Albion
Scottish Second Division: 1960–61

Iraq
Arabian Gulf Cup: Runners-up 1976

References

External links
 Danny McLennan career at  Post War English & Scottish Football League A–Z Player's Database

1925 births
2004 deaths
Footballers from Stirling
Scottish footballers
Rangers F.C. players
Stirling Albion F.C. players
East Fife F.C. players
Dundee F.C. players
Berwick Rangers F.C. players
Scottish Football League players
Scottish football managers
Scottish expatriate football managers
Berwick Rangers F.C. managers
Stirling Albion F.C. managers
Worcester City F.C. managers
Kongsvinger IL Toppfotball managers
Expatriate football managers in the Philippines
Philippines national football team managers
Expatriate football managers in Mauritius
Mauritius national football team managers
Expatriate football managers in Zimbabwe
Zimbabwe national football team managers
Expatriate football managers in Iran
Iran national football team managers
Expatriate football managers in Bahrain
Bahrain national football team managers
Expatriate football managers in Iraq
Iraq national football team managers
Expatriate football managers in Malawi
Malawi national football team managers
Expatriate football managers in Jordan
Jordan national football team managers
Expatriate football managers in Fiji
Fiji national football team managers
Expatriate football managers in Libya
Libya national football team managers
Expatriate football managers in India
Scottish expatriate sportspeople in Norway
Expatriate football managers in Norway
Expatriate football managers in Tanzania
Scottish Football League managers
Scottish expatriate sportspeople in Fiji
People from Stirling (council area)
Falkirk F.C. players
Churchill Brothers FC Goa managers
1984 African Cup of Nations managers
Association football inside forwards
Association football wing halves